Stela Semanová (born 30 April 2001) is a Slovak footballer who plays as a forward for Women's First League club Partizán Bardejov and the Slovakia women's national team.

Club career
Semanová has played for Partizán Bardejov in Slovakia at the UEFA Women's Champions League.

International career
Semanová capped for Slovakia at senior level during the UEFA Women's Euro 2022 qualifying.

References

2001 births
Living people
Slovak women's footballers
Women's association football forwards
Partizán Bardejov players
Slovakia women's international footballers